Billbergia pallidiflora is a species of flowering plant in the family Bromeliaceae. This species is native to Central America (Guatemala, El Salvador, Honduras, Nicaragua) and western Mexico (as far north as Sinaloa).

References

pallidiflora
Flora of Mexico
Flora of Central America
Plants described in 1854